Eucalyptus accedens, commonly known as smooth bark wandoo or powderbark wandoo is a species of tree endemic to the south-west of Western Australia. Although the common names suggest it is similar to wandoo, (Eucalyptus wandoo), the two species are very different botanically. The bark of E. accedens has talc-like powder, at least on the protected side of the trunk and the tree usually grows on laterite in higher places.

Description
The smooth bark is notable for being covered in a talc-like powder. It is pale-white when fresh, turning a shade of orange before being shed again. The adult leaves are arranged alternately and are the same dull blue-green colour on both sides.

White flowers are produced between December and April. It will form pedicellate buds in clusters of 7, 9 or 11, with cylindrical to obovoid or ovoid shape.

Eucalyptus wandoo and E. accedens have a very similar appearance, but can be distinguished by the orangey coloured powdery coating on the bark of E. accedens that appears seasonally. It also has larger, more rounded buds and more rounded juvenile foliage.

Taxonomy and naming
Eucalyptus accedens was first formally described in 1904 by William Vincent Fitzgerald from specimens he had collected near Pingelly the previous year. The specific epithet (accedens) is a Latin word meaning "approaching" or "resembling", referring to the similarity of the bark of this species to that of E. wandoo.

Distribution and habitat
Powderbark wandoo will grow in gravelly or clay-loam soils over laterite. It is commonly found on stony ridges or lateritic breakaways and often above stands of Eucalyptus wandoo. Its range extends from south east of Geraldton in the Mid West region south through the Darling Range as far as Williams, Western Australia in the Wheatbelt region.

Occurring on woodland areas, associated species include E. wandoo as E. wandoo often occurs below E. accedens in the overstorey landscape, and occasionally with E. astringens, and sometimes with E. marginata on the western fringe. In the understorey, shrubs such as Hypocalymma angustifolia, Hibbertia hypericoides, Hakea lissocarpha, Acacia pulchella, Hovea chorizemifolia, Gastrolobium microcarpum, Lepidosperma leptostachyum and Bossiaea eriocarpa are often found.

Conservation
This eucalypt is classified as "not threatened" by the Western Australian Government Department of Parks and Wildlife.

Uses

Use in horticulture
Eucalyptus accedens is now commonly sold as an ornamental shade or shelter tree. Bark is often used to deter ants. It tolerates a wide range of soil types except for lime and is reasonably drought tolerant and is available as seed or seedlings.

The powder that accumulates on the trunk was tested as a deterrent for arthropods in 2004. The results demonstrated that ant mortality was much greater on paper discs coated with the powder than on control discs.

See also
List of Eucalyptus species

References

accedens
Trees of Australia
Eucalypts of Western Australia
Myrtales of Australia
Trees of Mediterranean climate
Plants described in 1904
Taxa named by William Vincent Fitzgerald
Endemic flora of Southwest Australia